Robert Pell (born 5 February 1979) is an English football forward.

He was born in Leeds. Between 1996 and 2001 he played for Rotherham United, Doncaster Rovers, Northwich Victoria and Southport. In late 2002 he played abroad for Larvik Fotball. He then returned to Southport in January 2003, and also played for Worksop Town later that year.

References

1979 births
Living people
Footballers from Leeds
English footballers
Rotherham United F.C. players
Doncaster Rovers F.C. players
Northwich Victoria F.C. players
Southport F.C. players
Worksop Town F.C. players
English expatriate footballers
English expatriate sportspeople in Norway
Expatriate footballers in Norway
Association football forwards